Nicholas Ochs (born 1985 or 1986), sometimes Nick Ochs, is a former U.S. Marine, a 2020 Republican Hawaii House of Representatives candidate, and the founder of the Proud Boys' Hawaii chapter.

After taking part in January 6 United States Capitol attack, he pleaded guilty to obstructing a federal proceeding and was sentenced to four years in prison.

Education 
Ochs attended the University of Hawaiʻi.

Career 
Ochs has worked as a U.S. Marine, based in Hawaii.

Politics 

In November 2020, Ochs ran as a Republican candidate to represent the Waikiki neighbourhood in the Hawaii House of Representatives. He won the primary but badly lost the general election to Democratic candidate Adrian Tam. During the election, Ochs's campaign page was removed from Facebook for breaching the company's terms of service. Ochs won 29.7% of the vote, Tam won 63%. Ochs's campaign was endorsed by Roger Stone.

Capitol attack 

Ochs is a high ranking "elder" of the Proud Boys right wing neo-fascist organisation. During the January 6 United States Capitol attack, Ochs threw smoke bombs at police officers and trespassed into the United States Capitol where he smoked cigarettes. The same day, he posted in photograph in front of the words "Murder the Media".

In September 2022, Ochs pleaded guilty to obstructing a federal proceeding in a joint prosecution with Nicolas DeCarlo. During his court appearance, Ochs claims he was a journalist. In December 2022, he was fined $5,000, and sentenced to four years in jail, and three years of supervised release.

Personal life 
Ochs was aged 36 in 2022. He is married and lived in Honolulu, Hawaii.

See also 

 Criminal proceedings in the January 6 United States Capitol attack

References

External links 

 Ochs for Hawaii – official website (3 August 2020 archive via Way Back Machine)

Living people
1980s births
Convicted participants in the January 6 United States Capitol attack
People from Honolulu
University of Hawaiʻi at Mānoa alumni
United States Marines
Proud Boys
Alt-right activists